Sligo Creek Parkway is a two-lane at-grade automobile parkway in Montgomery County in the U.S. state of Maryland.  The two-lane parkway runs  from Maryland Route 650 (MD 650) in Takoma Park through Silver Spring north to MD 193 in Maryland.  Sligo Creek Parkway parallels Sligo Creek and the Sligo Creek Trail as it passes through various units of Sligo Creek Park and by a variety of recreational facilities.  The parkway is maintained by the Maryland-National Capital Park and Planning Commission.  Sligo Creek Parkway is closed to trucks at all times.  In addition, the section between Old Carroll Avenue and MD 320 is closed to automobile traffic on Sundays.

Route description 

Sligo Creek Parkway begins at MD 650 (New Hampshire Avenue) in Takoma Park. At a southward bend of Sligo Creek, Flower Avenue continues straight while Sligo Creek Parkway turns south. After returning to a westward heading, the parkway intersects Old Carroll Avenue, which is used to access MD 195 (Carroll Avenue), which passes above the parkway on the Carroll Avenue Bridge. Old Carroll Avenue is also the southern limit of road closure on Sundays. When Sligo Creek Parkway reaches Maple Avenue, the parkway becomes concurrent with Maple Avenue and crosses Sligo Creek and the Sligo Creek Trail at grade. From this point, the creek and trail remain south of the parkway. At the next intersection, Maple Avenue continues north, an entrance to Washington Adventist Hospital is on the east, and Sligo Creek Parkway heads west.

Sligo Creek Parkway continues northwest through Takoma Park on a stretch featuring many blind curves.  After the curvy section, the parkway temporarily turns west and intersects MD 320 (Piney Branch Road), which is the northern limit of road closure on Sundays. Throughout this road closure section, residents local to Sligo Creek Parkway are granted vehicular access. Sligo Creek Parkway resumes its northwest course through Silver Spring and meets MD 594 (Wayne Avenue).  Beyond Wayne Avenue, the parkway comes to a three-way stop at Schuyler Road and speed humps start crossing the road at regular intervals.  Houses also line the east side of the parkway leading up to the five-way intersection with U.S. Route 29 (Colesville Road).  The parkway continues northwest, passing Brunett Avenue, then turns north and parallels the Sligo Creek Golf Course.  Sligo Creek Parkway passes under the Capital Beltway before intersecting Forest Glen Road.  After meeting Dennis Avenue at a four-way stop, the parkway continues north to its terminus at MD 193 (University Boulevard) in Wheaton.

The average gradient of the parkway is .75%, with occasional sections exceeding 4%; generally the parkway becomes steeper and more undulating as one approaches the southern terminus.  The stretch immediately south of Piney Branch/MD-320 is fairly steep, as is the area around the intersection with Old Carroll Ave.  The total elevation difference/change on the parkway is 220 feet, with the northern terminus being 345 feet above sea level at University Blvd., and the southern terminus being 225 feet above sea level at New Hampshire Avenue.

Junction list

See also

List of car-free places

References

External links
 

Kemp Mill, Maryland
Sligo Creek Parkway
Silver Spring, Maryland
Takoma Park, Maryland
Wheaton, Maryland